Bardzlino  is a village in the administrative district of Gmina Świeszyno, within Koszalin County, West Pomeranian Voivodeship, in north-western Poland. 

The village has a population of 147.

References

Bardzlino